Qila Raipur was a Punjab Legislative Assembly constituency till 2012. It was also won by then Punjab Chief Minister in 1997.

Members of the Legislative Assembly

Election results

1997

1992

References

External links
 

Former assembly constituencies of Punjab, India
Ludhiana district